Fouzia Habib is a Pakistani politician who served as member of the National Assembly of Pakistan.

Political career
She was elected to the National Assembly of Pakistan as a candidate of Pakistan Peoples Party on a seat reserved for women in the 2002 Pakistani general election.

She was elected to the National Assembly of Pakistan from Punjab as a candidate of Pakistan Peoples Party on a seat reserved for women in the 2008 Pakistani general election.

References

Pakistani MNAs 2008–2013
Pakistani MNAs 2002–2007
Women members of the National Assembly of Pakistan
Living people
Year of birth missing (living people)
21st-century Pakistani women politicians